

226001–226100 

|-bgcolor=#f2f2f2
| colspan=4 align=center | 
|}

226101–226200 

|-bgcolor=#f2f2f2
| colspan=4 align=center | 
|}

226201–226300 

|-bgcolor=#f2f2f2
| colspan=4 align=center | 
|}

226301–226400 

|-bgcolor=#f2f2f2
| colspan=4 align=center | 
|}

226401–226500 

|-bgcolor=#f2f2f2
| colspan=4 align=center | 
|}

226501–226600 

|-bgcolor=#f2f2f2
| colspan=4 align=center | 
|}

226601–226700 

|-id=672
|  226672 Kucinskas ||  || Arunas Kucinskas (born 1967), a professor at the Astronomical Observatory of Vilnius University. || 
|}

226701–226800 

|-bgcolor=#f2f2f2
| colspan=4 align=center | 
|}

226801–226900 

|-id=858
| 226858 Ivanpuluj ||  || Ivan Puluj (1845–1918) was a pioneering Ukrainian-born physicist and inventor. He contributed greatly to the understanding of the properties and origin of cathode rays, the properties of X-rays, and the interpretation of X-radiation. Together with I. Kulish and I. Nechuy-Levitsky, he translated the Scriptures into Ukrainian. || 
|-id=861
|  226861 Elimaor ||  || Eli Maor (born 1937) is a respected historian of mathematics, whose books include To Infinity and Beyond (1991), e: The Story of a Number (1994) and The Pythagorean Theorem: A 4,000 Year History (2007). To sky watchers, he is best known for his definitive history Venus in Transit (2000). || 
|}

226901–227000 

|-bgcolor=#f2f2f2
| colspan=4 align=center | 
|}

References 

226001-227000